This list of archaeological sites is sorted by continent and then by the age of the site. For one sorted by country, see the list of archaeological sites by country.

Asia

Palaeolithic

Lower
 Azykh, Azerbaijan
 Barda Balka, Iraq
 Berekhat Ram,  Israel
 Bnat Ya'akob Bridge, Israel
 Darband Cave, Iran
 Dmanisi, Georgia
 Ganj Par, Iran
 Kashafrud, Iran
 Kudaro, Georgia
 Satanidar, Armenia
 Shiwatoo, Iran
 Soanian, India
Attirampakkam, India

 Ubeidiya, Israel
 Wong Tei Tung (Sam Chung), Hong Kong
 Zhoukoudian, China

Middle
 Dederiyeh Cave, Syria
 Amud Cave,  Israel
 Shanidar, Iraq
 Bisitun, Iran
 Warwasi, Iran
 Kiaram, Iran
 Qaleh Bozi, Iran
Attirampakkam, India
 Dawara, Syria
 Karain, Turkey

Upper
 Magura Cave, Bulgaria
 Kandivili, India
 Ksar Akil, Lebanon
 Rock Shelters of Bhimbetka, India
 Shanidar, Iraq
 Yafteh, Iran

Mesolithic
 Abu Hureyra, Syria
 Anjiri, Iran
 Dar Mar, Iran
 Fukui cave, Japan
 Ghar-e Khar, Iran
 Senpukuji Cave, Japan
 Warwasi, Iran
 Yawan, Iran
 Zarzi, Iraq

Neolithic
 Hambantota, Sri Lanka
 Ali Kosh, Iran
 Atlit Yam, Israel
 Asiab, Iran
 Çatalhöyük, Turkey
 Sanganakallu, India
 Choqa Golan, Iran
 Ganj Dareh, Iran
 Göbekli Tepe, Turkey
 Guran, Iran
 Jhusi, India
Paiyampalli, India
 Jarmo, Iraq
 Jericho, Palestine
 Karahan Tepe, Turkey
Nevali Çori, Turkey
 Mehrgarh, Pakistan
 Niumatou Site, Taiwan
 Tepe Sarab, Iran

Bronze Age
 Beycesultan, Turkey
Dholavira, India
 Lothal, India
 Troy, Turkey
Kalibangan, India
 Ugarit, Syria
 Uluburun, Turkey
Mohenjo Daro, Pakistan
Harappa, Pakistan
Kanmer, India
Rehman Dheri, Pakistan
Rakhigarhi, India
Amri, Pakistan
Nausharo, Pakistan

Iron Age
 Ahichatra, India
 Hattusa, Turkey
 Mathura, India
Keeladi, India
 Nineveh, Iraq
 Hassanlu, Iran
 Zywieh, Iran
 Bukan, Iran
 Taite, Syria
 Mesha Stele, Israel
 Tel Dan Stele, Israel

Greek and Roman Period
 Halicarnassos, Turkey
 Knidos, Turkey
 Miletus, Turkey
 Myra, Turkey
 Salamis, Cyprus

Africa

Palaeolithic

Pre-Palaeolithic (before stone tools)
 Laetoli, Tanzania (Pliocene)
 Hadar, Ethiopia

Lower Palaeolithic
 Olduvai Gorge, Tanzania, lower Palaeolithic, Oldowan
 Kalambo Falls

Middle Palaeolithic
 Cango Caves, South Africa, Middle Paleolithic
 Klasies River Caves, South Africa, Middle Paleolithic
 Hoedjiespunt, South Africa, Middle Pleistocene
 Omo, Ethiopia

Upper Palaeolithic
 Blombos Cave, South Africa, Upper Paleolithic
 Taforalt, Morocco
 Sibudu Cave South Africa, Upper Paleolithic

Mesolithic

Neolithic

Iron Bronze Age
 Carthage, Tunisia (Phoenician)
 Cyrene, Libya

Greek and Roman Period
 Volubilis, Morocco

11th to 15th centuries
 Mifsas Bahri, Ethiopia
 Great Zimbabwe, Zimbabwe

Americas

Lithic/Paleoindian (before 8000 BCE)
 Pikimachay, Peru
 Cueva de las Manos, Argentina
 Cuz Cuz, Chile
 Bandelier National Monument, New Mexico, United States
 Meadowcroft Rock Shelter, Pennsylvania, United States
 Monte Verde, Chile
 Pilauco Bajo, Chile
 St. Mary Reservoir, Alberta, Canada
 El Abra, Colombia
 Tequendama, Colombia

Archaic (8000–1000 BCE)
 Chan-Chan, Chile
 Guitarrero Cave, Peru
 Cuz Cuz, Chile
 Toquepala Caves, Peru
 Jisk'a Iru Muqu, Río Ilave, Peru
 Caral, Lima, Peru
 Garagay, Lima, Peru
 Meadowcroft Rock Shelter, Pennsylvania, United States
 Tiawanaku, Bolivia
 Aguazuque, Colombia
 Checua, Colombia
Watson Brake, Louisiana, United States
Poverty Point, Louisiana, United States

Formative (1000 BCE–250/500 CE)
 Acaray, Huaura River, Peru
 Altar de Sacrificios, Guatemala
 Cara Sucia, El Salvador
 Chaco Culture National Historical Park, New Mexico, United States
 Chiripa, Bolivia
 Cuello, Belize
 Cuz Cuz, Chile
 El Mirador, Guatemala
 La Venta, Mexico
 Nakbe, Guatemala
 El Tintal, Guatemala
 Quelepa, El Salvador
 Snaketown, Arizona, United States
 Tiawanaku, Bolivia
 Takalik Abaj, Guatemala
 Tulor, Chile
Newark Earthworks, Ohio, United States
Serpent Mound, Ohio, United States

Classic (250/500–1200 CE)
 Acaray, Huaura River, Peru
 Aguateca, Guatemala
 Bandelier National Monument, New Mexico, United States
 Bonampak, Mexico
 Cahokia, Illinois, United States
 Calakmul, Mexico
 Cancuén, Guatemala
 Cara Sucia, El Salvador
 Chichen Itza, Mexico
 Chiripa, Bolivia
 Copán, Honduras
 Cuz Cuz, Chile
 Dos Pilas, Guatemala
 El Tajín, Mexico
 Ixlu, Guatemala
 Kaminaljuyu, Guatemala
 Machaquila, Guatemala
 Monte Albán, Mexico
 Motul de San José, Guatemala
 Palenque, Mexico
 Pukara de Quitor, Chile
 Pucará de Tilcara, Argentina
 Quelepa, El Salvador
 Quiriguá, Guatemala
 Seibal, Guatemala
 Snaketown, Arizona, United States
 Takalik Abaj, Guatemala
 Tamarindito, Guatemala
 Teotihuacan, Mexico
 Tiawanaku, Bolivia
 Tikal, Guatemala
 Toniná, Mexico
 Tulor, Chile
 Uaxactun, Guatemala
 Yaxchilan, Mexico
 Yaxha, Guatemala
 Zaculeu
 Chaco Culture National Historical Park, New Mexico, United States
 Fort Ancient site, Ohio, United States
 Head-Smashed-In Buffalo Jump, Alberta

Post-Classic (1200–1900 CE)
 Acaray, Huaura River, Peru
 Cahokia, Illinois, United States
 Cuz Cuz, Chile
 Gila Cliff Dwellings National Monument, New Mexico, USA
 Huaca de Chena, Chile
 Inkallaqta, Bolivia
 Iximche, Guatemala
 Machu Picchu, Peru
 Mixco Viejo, Guatemala
 Mocha Island, Chile
 Pucara del Cerro La Muralla, Chile
 Pukara de La Compañia, Chile
 Q'umarkaj, Guatemala
 Santa Cecilia Acatitlan, Mexico
 Snaketown, Arizona, USA
 Tenayuca, Mexico
 Tenochtitlan, Mexico
 Tlatelolco, Mexico
 Topoxte, Guatemala
 Yagul, Mexico
 Zaculeu, Guatemala

Oceania

Palaeolithic
 Lake Mungo
 Ngarrabullgan

Classical Period
 Maungarei / Mount Wellington, New Zealand
 Rapa Nui, (Rano Raraku, Orongo & Anakena) Chile
 Nan Madol

Europe

Palaeolithic

Lower
 Kozarnika, Bulgaria
 Barnfield Pit, Kent, Great Britain
 Bilzingsleben, Thuringia, Germany. Clactonian
 Boxgrove, East Sussex, Great Britain.
 Clacton-on-Sea, Great Britain. Clactonian
 Ca’ Belvedere, Forlì, Italy
 Pineta, Isernia,  Italy
 Vértesszőlős, Hungary

Middle
 Băile Herculane, Romania, middle Palaeolithic as well as Mesolithic
 Creswell Crags, Great Britain
 Grotta di Nùrighe, Cheremule, Italy
 Königsaue, Germany
 Krapina Neanderthal Site, Croatia
 Le Moustier, France, Mousterian
 Neanderthal, Germany, Neandertal

Upper
 Altamira, Cantabria, Spain
 Aurignac, Haute Garonne, France, Aurignacian
 Châtelperron, central and south western France, Châtelperronian
 Chauvet Cave, southern France, Aurignacian
 Côa Valley Paleolithic Art, northeastern Portugal
 Dolni Vestonice, Gravettian, Moravia
 Grotta Corbeddu, Oliena, Italy
 Ignateva Cave, South Urals, Russia
 La Gravette, Dordogne, France, Gravettian
 La Madeleine, Dordogne, France, Magdalenian
 Lascaux, Dordogne, France, Magdalenian
 Meiendorf, northern Germany, Hamburgian Culture
 Mladec, Moravia, Aurignacian
 Paviland Caves, Great Britain, Wales, Aurignacian
 Solutré, eastern France, Solutrean

Mesolithic

 Alby, Sweden
 Arbus, Sardinia, Italy
 Astuvansalmi, Finland
 Belbaşı, Turkey
 Bouldnor Cliff Mesolithic Village, United Kingdom
 Cramond, United Kingdom
 Franchthi, Greece
 Friesack, Germany, Brandenburg
 Grotta di Su Coloru, Laerru, Italy
 Hohen Viecheln, Germany, Mecklenburg
 Howick house, United Kingdom
 Pulli settlement, Estonia
 Lepenski Vir, Serbia
 Star Carr and Star Carr house, United Kingdom
 Mount Sandal Northern Ireland, United Kingdom
 Val Camonica, Brescia, Italy
 Ythan Estuary, Sands of Forvie, Aberdeenshire, Scotland

Neolithic
 Almendres Cromlech, Portugal
 Ardgroom, Ireland
 Avebury, Britain
 Bylany, Czech Republic
 Carnac stones, France
 Carrigagulla, Ireland
 Çatalhöyük, Turkey
 Cucuteni-Trypillian culture, Moldova, Romania, Ukraine
 Durankulak (archaeological site), Bulgaria
 Glantane east, Ireland
 Goseck Germany
 Grimes Graves, Britain
 Karanovo culture, Bulgaria
 Knocknakilla, Ireland
 La Hoguette, France
 Maeshowe Britain
 Maiden Castle Britain
 Maumbury Rings, Britain
 Medway Megaliths, Britain
 Fairy Toot at Nempnett Thrubwell, Britain
 Necropolis of Anghelu Ruju, Italy
 Necropolis of Li Muri, Italy
 Newgrange, Ireland
 Parc Cwm long cairn, Britain
 Ring of Brodgar Britain
 St Lythans burial chamber, Britain
 Sassi of Materna, Italy
 Silbury Hill, Britain
 Skara Brae, Britain
 Stanton Drew, Britain
 Stonehenge, Britain
 Pfahlbau Museum Unteruhldingen Germany
 Varna culture
 Windmill Hill Britain
 West Kennet Long Barrow, Britain
 Zauschwitz, Germany

Chalcolithic and Bronze Age 

 Biskupin Poland
 Ezero culture, Bulgaria
 Flag Fen, Britain
 Lerna, Greece
 Knossos, Greece
 Mycenae, Greece
 Nebra, Germany
 Necropolis of Fossa, Italy
 Necropolis of Pantalica, Italy
 Nola-Croce del Papa, Italy
 Palmi, Italy
 Perperikon, Bulgaria
 Siedlung Forschner, Germany
 Su Nuraxi di Barumini, Italy
 Tiryns, Greece
 Únětice, Czech Republic
 Varna Necropolis, Bulgaria
 Tell Yunatsite, Bulgaria
 Zug-Sumpf, Switzerland

Iron Age, Classical Antiquity, Hellenistic period, Early Greco-Roman Period and Roman Period 

 Abritus, Bulgaria
 Agrigento, Italy
 Ambresbury Banks, Britain
 Armira (villa), Bulgaria
 Aquae Calidae, Bulgaria
 Castra Martis, Bulgaria
 Dionysopolis, Bulgaria
 Bibracte, France
 Biskupin, Poland
 Chew Stoke (Romano-Celtic Temple), Britain
 Chysauster, Britain
 Glanum (near Saint-Rémy-de-Provence), France
 Inchtuthil, Britain
 Danebury, Britain
 Develtos, Bulgaria
 Diocletianopolis (modern Hisarya), Bulgaria
 Dover Castle, Britain
 Dover painted house, Britain
 Forum Romanum, Italy
 Gene fornby, Sweden
 Heraclea Sintica, Bulgaria
 Heuneburg, Germany
 Hirschlanden, Germany
 Kabyle, Bulgaria
 Mont Vully, Switzerland
 Maiden Castle, Britain
 Marcianopolis, Bulgaria
 Mezek, Bulgaria
 Nesebar, Bulgaria
 Nicopolis ad Istrum, Bulgaria
 Nicopolis ad Nestum, Bulgaria
 Novae
 Odessus, modern Varna, Bulgaria
 Oescus, Bulgaria
 Olympia, Greece
 Oppidum of Manching, Germany
 Paestum, Italy
 Philippopolis, modern Plovdiv, Bulgaria
 Pistiros, Bulgaria
 Pompeii, Italy
 Saalburg, Germany
 Salami Island, Greece
 Serdica, modern Sofia, Bulgaria
 Seuthopolis, Bulgaria
 Silistra Roman Tomb, Bulgaria
 Sozopol, Bulgaria
 Sparta, Greece
 Stara Zagora - Roman ruins of Augusta Trayana, Bulgaria
 Starosel, Bulgaria
 Storgosia, Bulgaria 
 Syracuse, Italy
 Tatul, Bulgaria
 La Tene, Switzerland
 Thracian Tomb of Kazanlak, Bulgaria
 Thracian Tomb of Sveshtari, Bulgaria
 Thracian tomb of Aleksandrovo, Bulgaria
 Tomb of Pomorie, Bulgaria
 Trophaeum Traiani, Romania
 Tróia, Portugal
 Tusculum, Italy
 Üllő5, Hungary
 Verulamium, Britain
 Vix and Mont Lassois, France

Early Medieval
 Adelsö, Sweden
 Birka, Sweden
 Gamla Uppsala, Sweden
 Helgö, Sweden
 Ivanovo rock-hewn churches, Bulgaria
 Jellinge, Denmark
 Kaliakra cape, Bulgaria
 Madara Rider, Bulgaria
 Nydam, Denmark
 Oseberg ship, Norway
 Pliska, Bulgaria
 Preslav, Bulgaria
 South Cadbury, Britain
 Sutton Hoo, Britain
 Thorsberg, Denmark
 Valsgärde, Sweden
 Vendel, Sweden

See also 
 List of archaeological sites by country

Sites

Archaeology
Lists by continent